Terence Alphonso Todman (March 13, 1926 – August 13, 2014) was an American diplomat who served as the U.S. Ambassador to Chad, Guinea, Costa Rica, Spain, Denmark, and Argentina. In 1990, he was awarded the rank of Career Ambassador.

Life
Todman was born on Saint Thomas, U.S. Virgin Islands, on March 13, 1926. His mother worked as a house maid and laundress, and his father was a grocery clerk. His childhood in St. Thomas would prove influential in his decision to become a diplomat. He later spoke of his school years as such: "...we found ourselves doing studies on different countries, obviously at a high school level, but nevertheless you got exposed to the fact that there were other places, other people, other things happening. So, with the movement of people in and out and with that kind of intellectual academic preparation, it made for a consciousness of a world outside and of the need to deal with other people." He graduated Charlotte Amalia High School second in his class.

Todman graduated from the Interamerican University of Puerto Rico summa cum laude. He was drafted while in college and served in Japan from 1945 to 1949. Todman earned an M.P.A. degree from the Maxwell Graduate School of Citizenship and Public Affairs at Syracuse University in 1952; the top-ranked and most prestigious graduate school of public administration. After passing the Federal Entry Exam, Todman received offers from the Office of Management and Budget, the Office of Personnel Management, the Bureau of Indian Affairs and the State Department. He joined the State Department and, the following year, passed the Foreign Service Examination.

During his Ambassadorship in Guinea, his embassy was under eavesdropping of the Soviet Union's KGB. His appointment as ambassador to Costa Rica in 1974 represented the first African American to be given the title in a Spanish-speaking country.

Todman was a member of Alpha Phi Alpha fraternity. He was also a director of Exxcel Group.

Personal life and death
Todman was fluent in Spanish, French, Arabic, Hindu, and Japanese. He married Doris Weston; they had four children. On August 13, 2014, Todman died at the age of 88, at a hospital in Saint Thomas.

References

External links

 Terence Todman at The Political Graveyard
 United States Department of State: Chiefs of Mission by Country

1926 births
2014 deaths
Ambassadors of the United States to Argentina
Ambassadors of the United States to Chad
Ambassadors of the United States to Costa Rica
Ambassadors of the United States to Denmark
Ambassadors of the United States to Guinea
Ambassadors of the United States to Spain
United States Career Ambassadors
Interamerican University of Puerto Rico alumni
Syracuse University alumni
United States Army personnel of World War II
People from Saint Thomas, U.S. Virgin Islands
African-American diplomats
United States Foreign Service personnel
United States Army officers
20th-century African-American people
21st-century African-American people
20th-century American diplomats